Curse of the Cannibal Confederates (also known as The Curse of the Screaming Dead) is a 1982 American horror film directed by Tony Malanowski and distributed by Troma Entertainment. The film follows six friends who unwittingly raise the undead corpses of Confederate soldiers.

Plot
A group of six friends (Mel, Wyatt, Bill, Blind Kiyomi, Lin, and Sarah) are on a deer hunt in the southern United States. Kiyomi hears noises in the distance, and her boyfriend Mel goes to investigate. He then leads the others to a church graveyard in the woods where long-dead Confederate soldiers from the American Civil War are buried. The group argues over whether to take the items that they find in the graves. Unbeknownst to the others, Mel takes a diary from one of the soldiers. They set up camp, and that night, they are attacked by the soldiers, who are now zombies. The group manages to fight the soldiers off with their guns. They leave the area and are stopped by police officers, who do not believe their story. Soon after, they are attacked by the soldiers again; Bill and the officers are killed and eaten. The others retreat to an abandoned house. The soldiers follow them there and kill Kiyomi, Sarah, and Mel. Wyatt gives the diary back, and the soldiers leave.

Cast
 Steve Sandkuhler as Wyatt
 Christopher Gummer as Mel
 Rebecca Bach as Sarah
 Judy Dixon as Lin
 Jim Ball as Bill
 Bumb Roberts as Deputy Franklin
 Mark Redfield as Captain Matthew Mahler
 Richard Ruxton as Police Captain Hal Fritz
 Mimi Ishikawa as Blind Kiyomi

Production
Filming took place in Maryland.

The film is a remake of sorts. It is based on a film that director Malanowski had collaborated with star Steve Sandkuhler, known as Night of Horror. The former was also about dead Confederate soldiers tormenting a bunch of dirty hippies in a Winnebago.

Reception
Despite no critical reviews, the film has a 23% score from audiences on Rotten Tomatoes based on 125 user ratings, with an average of 2.1/10.

Legacy
In his book, All I Need to Know about Filmmaking I Learned from the Toxic Avenger, Troma president Lloyd Kaufman lists this among the five worst films in Troma's library.

Mark Redfield, who played a minor role in the film, was one of the few crew members whose career continued after the film; he directed and starred in the critically successful 2006 film The Death of Poe.  Coincidentally, in Redfield's first collaboration with Malanowski, Night of Horror, one of the characters constantly quotes Poe's poem, The Raven.

References

External links
 
 

1982 horror films
1982 films
Remakes of American films
American zombie films
American independent films
Films shot in Maryland
Films about cannibalism
Horror film remakes
Troma Entertainment films
1980s English-language films
1980s American films